Slam, SLAM or SLAMS may refer to:

Arts, entertainment, and media

Fictional elements
 S.L.A.M. (Strategic Long-Range Artillery Machine), a fictional weapon in the G.I. Joe universe
 SLAMS (Space-Land-Air Missile Shield), a fictional anti-ballistic missile system featured in Tom Clancy's EndWar and briefly mentioned in other Tom Clancy's video games

Films
 Slam (1998 film), a 1998 film starring Saul Williams and Beau Sia
 Slam (2018 film), an Australian feature directed by Partho Sen-Gupta

Literature
 Slam (novel), a novel by Nick Hornby
 Slam!, a novel by Walter Dean Myers about a high school basketball star from Harlem
 Slam, a novel by Lewis Shiner

Music

Albums
 Slam (Big Dipper album), 1990
 Slam (Joe Lynn Turner album), 2001
 Slam (soundtrack), from the 1998 film
 , a 1989 album by Dan Reed Network
 Slam, a 1978 album by Suburban Studs

Songs
 "Slam" (Humanoid song), 1989
 "Slam" (Onyx song), 1993
 "Slam" (Pendulum song), 2005
 "Slam", a song by Bow Wow
 "Slam", a song by Seaway from Colour Blind
 "Slam", a 2002 song by A-Teens from Pop 'til You Drop!

Other uses in music
 Slam (DJs), an electronic music production and DJ duo from Glasgow
 Save Live Australian Music (or SLAM), a 2010 rally in Melbourne, Australia
 Slam death metal (often referred to as simply "slam"), a style of death metal

Other uses in arts, entertainment, and media
 Slam (cards), a contract in card games in which the player undertakes to win all tricks
 Slam (magazine), a basketball publication
 SLAM! (radio station), a Dutch radio station based in Naarden
 Poetry slam, a competition in which poets of all ages perform spoken word poetry
 Slam! Sports, a section of Canadian Online Explorer (i.e., Canoe.com)
 Slamdancing, a style of dance

Science and technology

Computing
 Simultaneous localization and mapping (or SLAM), a navigation technique used by robots and autonomous vehicles
 SLAM project, a Microsoft research project
 Simulation Language for Analogue Modelling (or SLAM), a simulation language, versions based on Fortran and GASP

Weapons
 Selectable Lightweight Attack Munition (or SLAM), a small United States multi-purpose landmine
 Shoulder-Launched Antiaircraft Missile (or SLAM), a competing design proposal rejected in favor of the FIM-43 Redeye
 Standoff Land Attack Missile (or SLAM), an over-the-horizon, all-weather cruise missile developed in the 1990s
 Submarine Launched Airflight Missile (or SLAM), an experimental variant of the British Blowpipe
 Supersonic Low Altitude Missile (or SLAM), a cancelled U.S. Air Force nuclear-powered cruise missile project of the 1950, nicknamed the flying crowbar

Other uses
 Signaling lymphocytic activation molecule (or SLAM), a family of genes

Sports
 Body slam, any move in which a wrestler picks up and throws an opponent down to the ground limp back-firs
 Chennai Slam, an Indian basketball team
 Grand slam (baseball), often shortened into "slam"

Other uses
 SLAM (clothing), a manufacturer of clothing based in Italy
 Saint Louis Art Museum (or SLAM), in St. Louis, Missouri
 Service Level Agreement Monitoring (or SLAM), often used in the National Health Service to describe data received by commissioners from providers
 South London and Maudsley NHS Foundation Trust (or SLAM), a group of hospitals
 Abbreviation or nickname for S.L.A. Marshall, brigadier general and military journalist and historian

See also
 Grand Slam (disambiguation)
 Slam dunk (disambiguation)